The Arapaho National Recreation Area (ANRA) is a United States national recreation area located near the headwaters of the Colorado River in north central Colorado adjacent to Rocky Mountain National Park. ANRA is under the jurisdiction of the Arapaho-Roosevelt National Forest. ANRA contains five lakes in the upper Colorado River Valley: 
Lake Granby
Shadow Mountain Lake
Willow Creek Reservoir
Monarch Lake
Meadow Creek Reservoir

A sixth lake, Grand Lake, borders the recreation area on the north. Grand Lake is the largest natural lake in Colorado. Collectively, these six lakes are known as "The Great Lakes of Colorado."

The Continental Divide National Scenic Trail passes through the recreation area.

References

Protected areas of Grand County, Colorado
National Recreation Areas of the United States
Protected areas of Colorado
Protected areas established in 1978
Arapaho National Forest
1978 establishments in Colorado